Beeline is an album by American singer-songwriter Peter Case, released in 2002.

Critical reception

Writing for Allmusic, music critic Robert L. Doerschuk wrote "The low-budget production suggests that at least one of the goals here is to maintain Case's credibility as an off-center artist. In the end, though, this only contributes to a derivative quality… there's little to distinguish Bee Line from more insightful, wry, and far brighter highlights in the Case catalog." Writing for No Depression, David Menconi wrote of the album "In many ways, Beeline represents Case’s niftiest balancing act to date, adding touches of psychedelic ragtime and exotic raga drones to his steady rolling country blues… Beeline is anything but a downer, although the stoicism is more implied than spelled out."

Track listing
All songs written by Peter Case unless otherwise noted.
 "If You Got a Light to Shine" – 6:08
 "Evening Raga" – 4:39
 "I Hear Your Voice" – 5:05
 "Lost in the Sky" – 5:42
 "Gone" – 3:49
 "Something's Coming" – 5:58
 "Ain't Leaving Your Love" – 3:18
 "It's Cold Inside" – 3:52
 "Mañana Champeen" – 5:04
 "First Light" – 6:29
 "Something's Coming Remix" (Rob Swift) – 2:59

Personnel
 Peter Case – vocals, guitar, harmonica, piano
 Sandy Chila – drums
 David Meshell – bass
 Joshua Case – guitar
 Andrew Williams – harmonium

Production
 Andrew Williams – producer, engineer, mixing
 Peter Case – producer
 Travis Dickerson – engineer
 Gavin Lurssen – mastering
 Joshua Case – computer editing
 Greg Allen – package design, photography

References

2002 albums
Peter Case albums
Vanguard Records albums